John M. Jansen is a retired United States Marine Corps lieutenant general who last served as the Deputy Commandant for Programs and Resources. He previously served as the chairman of the Board of Directors, Marine Corps Community Services and was the 44th Commandant  (College President) of the Eisenhower School for National Security and Resource Strategy. He commanded 3d Marine Expeditionary Brigade, Marine Aircraft Group 11, and Marine Fighter Attack Squadron 251. He was a Marine Fighter/Attack pilot flying the F/A-18 in which he had almost 3,000 hours and in which he made over 480 arrested carrier landings. He was the Marine Tailhooker of the Year Award recipient in 2006.  For more than three decades, LtGen Jansen led Marines in first-response, security and high-risk combat operations around the globe to include nine overseas deployments.  

He served in four separate combat operations in Iraq and Afghanistan, as well as NATO support operations flying combat contingency missions over Bosnia/Herzegovina.  He spent nearly two years at sea including three deployments aboard aircraft carriers and time aboard amphibious assault ships.  He spent seven additional years stationed abroad in Japan, Germany, and Italy. Jansen served 35 years, from 1986 until 2021.

References

Indiana University alumni
Living people
Place of birth missing (living people)
Recipients of the Legion of Merit
United States Naval Aviators
United States Marine Corps generals
United States Marine Corps personnel of the War in Afghanistan (2001–2021)
Year of birth missing (living people)